National Pediatric Research Network Act of 2013 is a bill in the 113th United States Congress on February 4, 2013. It passed the United States House of Representatives and was sent to the Senate, where it was referred to the United States Senate Committee on Health, Education, Labor, and Pensions.

The purpose of the bill is "to amend title IV of the Public Health Service Act to provide for a National Pediatric Research Network, including with respect to pediatric rare diseases or conditions." The bill has received some support for researchers in the area of pediatric health who support the bill's goal of facilitating research, although there are some concerns about avoiding the creation of government red tape.

Background
In the 112th United States Congress a previous version of the Bill passed twice, one as a stand-alone bill and one as part of a larger piece of legislation.  Neither version was adopted because they did not make it out of the Senate.

Procedural history

Introduction
The Bill was introduced on January 14, 2013 by Rep. Lois Capps (D-CA).  She was joined by Rep. Cathy McMorris Rodgers (R-WA) and four other original cosponsors.

Sponsor
Rep. Lois Capps (D-CA)

Original Co-Sponsors
Rep. Cathy McMorris Rodgers (R-WA)
Rep. Diana DeGette (D-CO)
Rep. Gregg Harper (R-MS)
Rep. Doris O. Matsui (D-CA)
Rep. Peter T. King (R-NY)

Additional Co-Sponsors
Rep. Donna M. Christensen (D-VI)
Rep. Janice D. Schakowsky (D-IL)
Rep. Henry A. Waxman (D-CA)
Rep. Frank Pallone Jr. (D-NJ)
Rep. Kathy Castor (D-FL)

Committee
The Bill was referred to the United States House Committee on Energy and Commerce.  It was reported out of Committee on February 4, 2013.

Final debate and passage
The Bill was passed by the House on February 4, 2013 by a vote of 375-27.  It was considered under a suspension of the rules, something which typically only happens in the case of noncontroversial bills.

Senate Referral
After being passed by the House, the Bill was received by the United States Senate on February 7, 2013 and referred to the United States Senate Committee on Health, Education, Labor, and Pensions.

Provisions/Elements of the bill

The Bill would amend the Public Health Service Act to authorize the Director of the National Institutes of Health (NIH), in carrying out the Pediatric Research Initiative, to establish a National Pediatric Research Network.

The bill authorizes the Director of the NIH to award funding to public or private nonprofit groups that those groups can use to plan, establish, or improve pediatric research consortia.  The money can also be used to provide basic operating support for those consortia, including doing actual clinical research and training other researchers.  The awards should go to 20 or fewer consortia.  The Bill goes into greater specifics about the characteristics of these consortia and the rules they must agree to follow in order to get the funding. The bill indicates that this support will be for five years, with the option of a renewal.

The bill also requires the Director of the NIH to ensure that some of the awards go to consortia that will focus primarily on pediatric rare diseases of conditions and their treatment.  It also requires the creation of a data coordinating center to help network different doctors, hospitals, and clinics so that their research can be pooled.  The bill also includes a variety of reporting requirements and established a requirement that the consortia cooperate with the Centers for Disease Control and Prevention (CDC) to track patients.

See also

United States Public Health Service
Public Health Service Act
Title 42 of the United States Code

Notes/References

External links

Library of Congress THOMAS
  beta.congress.gov
GovTrack.us
OpenCongress.org
WashingtonWatch.com
Congressional Budget Office Report

Proposed legislation of the 112th United States Congress
Proposed legislation of the 113th United States Congress
United States proposed federal health legislation